More Stories is a selection of UNKLE works and remixes created during the War Stories era. The album was released in Japan on 16 January 2008, followed by a 31 January release date in Australia.

The Japan exclusive release comes in a cardboard sleeve and the CD is wrapped in a cloth sleeve. It also includes a booklet and obi-strip.

The cover art was designed by Kazuki, with additional design by Ben Drury and James Lavelle.

Track listing

Japanese edition
 "Serene"
 "Heaven"
 "Turnstile Blues (Surrender Sounds Sessions #4)"
 "Opened Dreams"
 "Blade in the Back"
 "Can't Stop"
 "Synthetic Water"
 "A Wash of Black"
 "Burn My Shadow (Radio Slave Remix)"
 "Hold My Hand (Buckley remix)"
 "Burn My Shadow (Surrender Sounds Sessions #5)"
Tracks 1, 2, 4 and 7 are from the score for the film Odyssey in Rome. "Blade in the Back" was played live at Unkle's first London gig, at the time it was called "Swampy".

Australian edition
CD 1
 Unkle, "Kaned and Able" (from the film Odyssey in Rome)
 Unkle, "Heaven" (from the film Odyssey in Rome)
 Autolux, "Turnstile Blues" (Surrender Sounds Sessions #4)
 Unkle, "Opened Dreams"
 Unkle, "Blade in the Back" (from the film Odyssey in Rome)
 Unkle, "Can't Stop"
 Unkle, "Synthetic Water" (from the film Odyssey in Rome)
 Unkle, "A Wash of Black"
 Layo & Bushwacka! – "Life2Live" (Surrender Sounds Sessions #1)
 Unkle, "Burn My Shadow" (Radio Slave Remix)
 Unkle, "Hold My Hand" (Dubfire Remix)
 Unkle, "Burn My Shadow" Surrender Sounds Sessions #5
CD 2
Instrumental versions from War Stories

Credits
Compiled By – James Lavelle, Pablo Clements
Computer (Pro Tools/logic) – Aidan Lavelle, Chris Allen, Pablo Clements
Engineer – Chris Allen, Pablo Clements
Mastered By – Howie Weinberg, Rob Thomas
Mixed By – Chris Allen
Producer – Chris Goss, UNKLE
Producer (Credited To) – Aidan Lavelle, Chris Allen, James Lavelle, Pablo Clements, Richard File
Programmed By – Aidan Lavelle, Chris Allen, Pablo Clements
Written By – Aidan Lavelle, Chris Allen, James Lavelle, Pablo Clements

References
discogs.com

2007 albums
Unkle albums
Albums produced by Chris Goss